Benjamin of Lesbos (alternatively transliterated as Veniamin of Lesvos or Lesvios; 1759–1824) was a Greek monk, scholar, and politician who was a significant figure in the Modern Greek Enlightenment.

Biography
Benjamin of Lesbos was born on the island of Lesbos in the town of Plomari. At the age of 17 he travelled to Mount Athos and there became a monk at Pantokratoros Monastery. In 1812 he was invited to direct the Patriarchal School in Constantinople, but declined this offer and instead settled in his native Lesbos to establish a school there. Later, in 1820, he taught at the Evangelical School of Smyrna. He also was associated with a school in nearby Ayvalık, where he was the principal instructor and earned the admiration of Lord Byron, who praised Benjamin as "a man of talent" and "a free-thinker". He died in 1824 in Nafplio, during the Greek War of Independence.

Philosophical thought
Benjamin of Lesbos was exposed to West European philosophical theories in his studies and travels, and was notably influenced by John Locke, especially in the area of epistemology. He played an intellectual role in Greek culture and has been described as a "remarkable philosopher" in his own right.

Legacy
Benjamin of Lesbos is commemorated in the Festival of Benjamin, held annually in late June in Plomari.

References

Further reading

1759 births
1824 deaths
People from Lesbos
Greeks from the Ottoman Empire
History of İzmir
People of the Modern Greek Enlightenment
18th-century Greek writers
19th-century Greek philosophers
19th-century Greek educators
19th-century Greek scientists
18th-century Greek philosophers
18th-century Greek educators
18th-century Greek scientists
18th-century Greek politicians
19th-century Greek politicians
People associated with Pantokratoros Monastery